East Community Learning Center (East CLC), formerly known as East High School, is a public high school in Akron, Ohio.  It is one of seven high schools in the Akron Public Schools. The building serves students in grades nine through twelve as well as a middle school wing for grades seven and eight.

History
The campus on Brittain Road opened in September 1955. The building replaced the previous home of East High School on Martha Avenue, which was rechristened as Goodyear Junior High School, later as Goodyear Middle School, and finally as the East Community Learning Center—Goodyear Campus in 2010.

From August 2008 to September 2010, students were temporarily relocated to the decommissioned Central-Hower High School, while the East High School building was renovated and expanded. The building reopened September 1, 2010 as the East Community Learning Center (ECLC).  For the beginning of the 2010–2011 school year the building accommodated grades 9–12, though an addition to the ECLC building was completed by January 2011 and added students in grades 7 and 8 from the former Goodyear Middle School.

State championships

 Boys Cross Country – 1933, 1937

2016 state playoff appearance first time in school history 
2016 City series champions 6-0
2018 state playoff appearance

Notable alumni
William Gerstenmaier, aerospace and mechanical engineer, NASA administrator for Human Exploration and Operations
James Ingram, musician
Gene Michael, former professional baseball player, manager, and executive in Major League Baseball
Gene Woodling, former professional baseball player in Major League Baseball

Notes and references

External links
 
 East Cluster of Schools

High schools in Akron, Ohio
Public high schools in Ohio